Interloper, Interlopers or The Interlopers may refer to:

Entertainment
 The Interloper: Lee Harvey Oswald Inside the Soviet Union,  a 2013 book by Peter Savodnik
 Interloper (comics), a fictional character in the Marvel Comics universe
 Interloper Films, a production company
 Interlopers (novel), a 2001 science fiction novel by Alan Dean Foster
 The Interloper, a 1918 American drama film directed by Oscar Apfel
 The Interlopers (novel)'', a Matt Helm spy novel by Donald Hamilton
 "The Interlopers", a short story by Saki
 Interloper (album), by Carbon Based Lifeforms

Other uses
 interloper (business)
 Interloper (asteroid), a nominal, but not true member of an asteroid family